Dowarabazar is an upazila of Sunamganj District in the Division of Sylhet, Bangladesh.

Geography
It has 27112 households and total area 324.19 km2 and bounded by the Indian state of Meghalaya and border on the north, and Chhatak Upazila on the south and east, Sunamganj Sadar Upazila on the west. Main rivers are Surma, Jadukata etc.

Demographics
As of the 2011 Bangladesh census, Dowarabazar has a population of 157240. Males constitute 50.74% of the population, and females 49.26%. This Upazila's eighteen up population is 76530.

Administration
Dowarabazar Upazila is divided into nine union parishads: Banglabazar, Bouglabazar, Dohalia, Dowarabazar, Laxmipur, Mannargaon, Norsingpur, Pandargaon, and Surma. The union parishads are subdivided into 151 mauzas and 308 villages.

Dowarabazar Model Govt Primary School,
Dowarabazar High School and Dowarabazar Degree College is situated in Dowarabazar town.

Notable residents
 Dewan Mohammad Azraf, teacher, author, politician, journalist and philosopher
 Abdul Mazid, freedom fighter, Member of Bangladesh Parliament    
 Kakon Bibi, Bangladeshi freedom fighter, Bir Protik

See also
Upazilas of Bangladesh
Districts of Bangladesh
Divisions of Bangladesh

References

Upazilas of Sunamganj District